Caroline Sy Hau (born 30 August 1969) is a Chinese-Filipino author and academic known for her work on Filipino culture and literature and for her books The Chinese Question: Ethnicity, Nation and Region In and Beyond the Philippines and Necessary Fictions: Philippine Literature and the Nation, 1946—1980.

Hau received her B.A. in English from the University of the Philippines Diliman and her M.A. and Ph.D. in English Language and Literature from Cornell University. She currently serves as Professor of Southeast Asian literature at the Center for Southeast Asian Studies in Kyoto University.

Hau co-writes a blog with fellow writer Trixie Alano Reguyal titled ikangablog.

Published works 

 Necessary Fictions: Philippine Literature and the Nation, 1946—1980. Ateneo de Manila University Press. (2000).
 On the Subject of the Nation: Filipino Writings from the Margins, 1981—2004. Ateneo de Manila University Press. (2004).
 The Chinese Question: Ethnicity, Nation and Region In and Beyond the Philippines. Ateneo de Manila University Press. (2014).
 Recuerdos de Patay and Other Stories. University of the Philippines Press. (2015).
 Elite: An Anthology. (Ed. with Katrina Tuvera and Isabelita O. Reyes) Anvil Publishing. (2016).
 Elites and Ilustrados in Philippine Culture. Ateneo de Manila University Press. (2017).
 Tiempo Muerto: A Novel. Ateneo de Manila University Press. (2019).

See also 

Benedict Anderson
Resil Mojares 
Leloy Claudio
Reynaldo Ileto
Xiao Chua

References 

Cornell University alumni
Filipino women academics
Filipino people of Chinese descent
Academic staff of Kyoto University
University of the Philippines Diliman alumni
Academic staff of the University of the Philippines Diliman